Bhavana is an Indian Malayalam-language soap opera. The show premiered on 26 June 2022 on Surya TV. It stars Stephy Leon in the title role along with Rayjan Rajan and Rekha Ratheesh in pivotal roles. It aires on Surya TV and on-demand through Sun NXT. It is an official remake of Tamil soap opera Kayal.

Synopsis
Abandoned by her father and coping with an alcoholic brother, Bhavana is her family's sole provider as a nurse. She finds happiness in her sacrifice to meet the needs of her brother and sisters.

Cast

Main

Production

Bhavana is an official remake of Tamil TV series Kayal. The first promo of the show featuring lead actress Stephy Leon was released by Surya TV in June 2022. The show premiered on Surya TV on 26 June 2022 replacing Ente Maathavu. It is telecasted every day at the 8:30 p.m. (IST) time slot.

In July 2022, lead actress Stephy Leon played a cameo appearance as Bhavana in TV series Kaliveedu.

Soundtrack

Adaptations

References

External links
 Official website 
 
 Bhavana at NETTV4U

Indian drama television series
Indian television soap operas
Indian television series
Malayalam-language television shows
2022 Indian television series debuts
Surya TV original programming
Malayalam-language television series based on Tamil-language television series